Juan Lanz (born 1 June 1932) is a Mexican former swimmer. He competed in the men's 100 metre freestyle at the 1952 Summer Olympics.

References

1932 births
Living people
Mexican male swimmers
Olympic swimmers of Mexico
Swimmers at the 1952 Summer Olympics
Place of birth missing (living people)